The Navy Command is the high command of the German Navy of the Bundeswehr as well as the staff of the Inspector of the Navy, the Navy's highest commander. It was formed in 2012, as a merger of the Navy Office (Marineamt), Naval Staff (Führungsstab der Marine), and Fleet Command (Flottenkommando), as part of a larger reorganization of the Bundeswehr. It is based in Rostock, Mecklenburg-Vorpommern.

Organisation 
The Navy Command is led by the Inspector of the Navy ranked Vice admiral, he is assisted by the Deputy Inspector of the Navy and Commander of the Fleet, as well as the Navy Commands Chief of Staff.

The command is structured in five departments. The forces of the Navy are assigned to the different departments heads.

 Operations
 Einsatzflottille 1
 Einsatzflottille 2
 Marinefliegerkommando
 Planning 
 Personnel, Training and Organization
 Schools of the Navy
 Operations Support 
 Marineunterstützungskommando
 Navy Medical Service
 Maritime Medicine Institute of the Navy

and the command staff.

References 

German Navy
Military units and formations established in 2012